Souk El Trouk is one of the souks of the medina of Tunis. It is specialized in clothing and embroidery trading.

History 
Souk El Trouk was initiated in the early 17th century by Yusuf Dey to satisfy the Turkish community. At the start, it was dedicated to tailors and embroiders of Turkish costumes such as the kaftan. Its main clients were the Turkish militia in Tunis and the dignitaries of the beylical regime.

Location 
The souk is located at the intersection of the Sidi Ben Arous and Tourbet El Bey streets, next to the Youssef Dey Mosque.

Notes and references

External links 
 
 Virtual visit of Souk El Trouk

Trouk
Clothing retailers of Tunisia